Major General Sir James Ainsworth Campden Gabriel Eyre,  (2 November 1930 – 3 January 2003) was a senior British Army officer, who served as Major-General Commanding the Household Division and General Officer Commanding London District from 1983 until his retirement in 1986.

Military career
Educated privately in the United States and at Harvard University, Eyre was commissioned into the Royal Horse Guards in 1955. He served in Cyprus and was mentioned in despatches for his role as an intelligence officer during the EOKA disturbances. He was appointed Commanding Officer of the Blues and Royals (RHG/D) in 1970. After serving as a General Staff Officer in London District from 1973 to 1975 he became Commanding Officer of the Household Cavalry Regiment and Silver Stick to The Queen.

Then in 1978 he was posted to HQ Northern Ireland during The Troubles as a Senior Intelligence Officer and sought to improve relations between the Police and the Army. In 1980 he was made Secretary to the Chiefs of Staff Committee at the Ministry of Defence, serving in that capacity there during the Falklands War, and in 1982 he became Director of Defence Programmes there.

He was appointed Major-General commanding the Household Division and General Officer Commanding London District in 1983 and retired in 1986.

In retirement he became a headhunter with Westminster Associates International.

Family
In 1967 he married Monica Smyth: they went on to have a son and a daughter.

References

 

1930 births
2003 deaths
Harvard University alumni
British Army major generals
Royal Horse Guards officers
Military personnel from London
Knights Commander of the Royal Victorian Order
Commanders of the Order of the British Empire
British military personnel of the Cyprus Emergency
Blues and Royals officers
British military personnel of The Troubles (Northern Ireland)